Diazaborine B is a chemical compound that inhibits maturation of rRNAs for the large ribosomal subunit.

References

Organoboron compounds
Sulfonamides
P-Tosyl compounds